The geology of Martinique originated from volcanic eruptions, but has different rocks than nearby Lesser Antilles volcanic island arc islands all of which formed in the last 40 million years in the Cenozoic. A high-alumina basalt ranges from olivine basalt to tridymite-rich dacite. Calc-alkaline volcanic rocks are rich in hornblende and orthpyroxene andesite, hornblende andesite and quartz-hornblende dacite are also common.
Mount Pelee is one of the most active Caribbean volcanoes with 20 eruptions in the last 5000 years. It also heats groundwater, generating hydrothermal eruptions at sulfur springs in 1751 and 1851.

References

Geography of Martinique
Natural history of Martinique
Martinique
Martinique
Martinique